Manninte Maril (English: In the Bosom of the Earth) is a 1979 Indian Malayalam film,  directed by P. A. Bakker, based on Cherukad's novel Manninte Maril. The film stars P. J. Antony in a lead role. The film has musical score by G. Devarajan.

Cast
P. J. Antony
Kaloor Sudhakaran
Kunjandi

Soundtrack
The music was composed by G. Devarajan and the lyrics were written by O. N. V. Kurup.

References

External links
 

1979 films
1970s Malayalam-language films